This is a list of members of the Tasmanian House of Assembly between the 10 May 1969 election and the 22 April 1972 election.

Sources
 Parliament of Tasmania (2006). The Parliament of Tasmania from 1856

Members of Tasmanian parliaments by term
20th-century Australian politicians